Farida Khanawadi is a village in the Athni subdistrict of Belgaum district in the southern state of Karnataka, India. In 2001 it had a population of 2,496 in 466 households.

References

Villages in Belagavi district